Tongren Polytechnic College (TRPTC) is a tertiary-level institution in Chuandong Education Park, Bijiang District, Tongren, Guizhou, China.

It formed in June 2002 as a merger of multiple tertiary institutions in Tongren; the Advanced Vocational and Technical School, the Agricultural School, the Commercial School, the Financial School, and the Medical School. The school has a  campus

References

External links
 Tongren Polytechnic College
 Tongren Polytechnic College 

Universities and colleges in Guizhou
2002 establishments in China
Educational institutions established in 2002